Sperry is a town in Tulsa County, Oklahoma, United States. The population was 1,205 in the 2010 U. S. census, compared to 1,351 in 2000. It is primarily a bedroom community, since approximately 85 percent of the employed residents commute to work in Tulsa and other nearby towns. Sperry also has an active retirement community.

History
Native American activity in the area antedates the establishment of the town. Of note during the Civil War was the Battle of Chusto-Talasah, fought approximately nine miles southeast on the “Caving Banks” bend of Bird Creek, where on December 9, 1861, Opothleyahola’s Union-allied Indians met the forces of Col. D.H. Cooper’s Confederate troops.

Sperry was originally known as Beuhler Switch. It was named after Charles Beuhler, an employee of the Midland Valley Railroad. The Sperry post office in the Cherokee Nation was established on May 17, 1902 to serve a rural community between Hominy and Delaware Creeks. The post office was located in the Carson Ranch house. The origin of the name Sperry is not clear. One source claims that the name was derived from the surname of a local landowner named Henry Spybuck. The Midland Valley Railroad built a line from Arkansas to Eastern Kansas that reached Sperry in March 1905.  The route no longer exists, but has been converted from rail into the 14.5 mile Osage Prairie Trail linking Sperry with Tulsa to the south and Skiatook to the north.

Exploration for oil brought prosperity between 1905 and 1910. Sperry incorporated in 1920, when the census recorded a population of 487. Two communities joined to form present-day Sperry. One was previously known as "Buehler Switch." This was the larger community, the location of the railroad and depot, and centered around 96th Street North and S. H. 11. The smaller community, consisting of only two or three homes and a general store/post office housed in the same building, was actually known as Sperry. It was on Hominy Creek. near 106th Street North and North Peoria. When statehood was granted in 1907, the post office was renamed Sperry and was moved from the general store to a new grocery store near the depot.

From 1982 to 1989, the Sperry WPA armory served as headquarters to the newly organized Oklahoma Army National Guard 45th Special Operations Aviation Regiment. The "Lords of Darkness" specialized in operating the OH-6 Little Bird helicopter while using night vision goggles. Aircraft were kept a short distance from the Tulsa Air National Guard Base. The unit evolved into the 1-245th Aviation Regiment, now housed at the Tulsa Army National Guard Aviation Complex near 46th St N and Highway 169 which was built 1988.

Geography
Sperry is located at  (36.295241, -95.989898).

Demographics

As of the census of 2000, there were 1,351 people, 375 households, and 78 families residing in the town. There were 406 housing units at an average density of 462.8 per square mile (178.1/km2). The racial makeup of the town was 70.64% White, 0.51% African American, 18.86% Native American, 0.10% Asian, 1.94% from other races, and 7.95% from two or more races. Hispanic or Latino of any race were 2.75% of the population.

There were 375 households, out of which 36.8% had children under the age of 18 living with them, 49.1% were married couples living together, 17.6% had a female householder with no husband present, and 28.3% were non-families. 25.3% of all households were made up of individuals, and 13.3% had someone living alone who was 65 years of age or older. The average household size was 2.60 and the average family size was 3.14.

In the town, the population was spread out, with 30.7% under the age of 18, 9.5% from 18 to 24, 25.2% from 25 to 44, 21.5% from 45 to 64, and 13.1% who were 65 years of age or older. The median age was 34 years. For every 100 females, there were 92.0 males. For every 100 females age 18 and over, there were 86.3 males.

The median income for a household in the town was $26,713, and the median income for a family was $30,192. Males had a median income of $26,167 versus $18,542 for females. The per capita income for the town was $11,767. About 15.1% of families and 89.2% of the population were below the poverty line, including 26.9% of those under age 18 and 12.9% of those age 65 or over.

Education
Sperry Public Schools is an independent school district in Sperry, Oklahoma serving grades K-12. The Elementary, Middle, and High School buildings share a campus on the western edge of Sperry.

References

Towns in Tulsa County, Oklahoma
Towns in Oklahoma
Tulsa metropolitan area